This is a list of people associated with Fudan University in Shanghai, China.

Government and Politics 
Wang Huning (王沪宁), Member of the 19th, 20th Politburo Standing Committee, Chairman of the CPPCC, First Secretary of the Party Secretariat.
Han Zheng, Member of the 19th Politburo Standing Committee, Vice Premier of China, Vice President of China.
Li Lanqing (李岚清), Member of the 15th Politburo Standing Committee, Vice Premier of China.
Ding Xuexiang (丁薛祥), Member of the 20th Politburo Standing Committee, Director of the General Office of the CPC, Secretary of the Party Secretariat.
Li Yuanchao (李源潮), Member of the 17th, 18th Politburo, Vice President of China.
Han Qide (韩启德), Vice Chairperson of the NPC, Vice Chairman of the CPPCC, Chairman of the Jiusan Society, Academician of CAS.
Sang Guowei (桑国卫), Vice Chairperson of the NPC, Chairman of the Chinese Peasants' and Workers' Democratic Party, Academician of CAE.
Chen Zhili (陈至立), Vice Chairperson of the NPC, Minister of Education of PRC, President of the ACWF.
Cai Dafeng (蔡达峰), Vice Chairperson of the NPC, Chairman of the China Association for Promoting Democracy.
Zhou Gucheng (周谷城), Vice Chairperson of the NPC, historian
Wang Jiarui (王家瑞), Vice Chairman of the CPPCC.
Tang Jiaxuan (唐家璇), Minister of Foreign Affairs.
Jiang Jufeng (蒋巨峰), Governor of Sichuan Province.
Liang Baohua (梁保华), Governor of Jiangsu Province.
Wang Wentao (王文涛), Governor of Heilongjiang Province.
Bagatur (巴特尔), Governor of Inner Mongolia.
Zhang Zhirang (张志让), Federal Judge of PRC.
Chen Jian (陈健), Vice Secretary-General of United Nations.
Nie Chenxi (聂辰席), director and Party branch secretary of National Radio and Television Administration and deputy director of Publicity Department of CPC
Jiang Mianheng (江绵恒), Vice President of the Chinese Academy of Sciences, first President of Shanghai Tech University
Shao Lizi (邵力子), notable politician, democrat.
Yu Youren (于右任), President of the Control Yuan of Republic of China.
Lee Huan (李焕), Premier of the Republic of China.
Yu Ching-tang (余井塘), Vice Premier of the Republic of China.
Juliana Young Koo (严幼韵), diplomatist
Li Dongsheng (李东生)，Minister of Public Security 
Wu Songgao (1898–1953), Republic of China politician, jurist and political scientist
Gong Xueping (龚学平), Vice Mayor of Shanghai

Humanities 
Chen Yinke (陈寅恪), sinologist, linguist, poet, historian
Chen Wangdao (陈望道), linguist, educator
Xu Beihong (徐悲鸿), painter, educator
Yan Fu (严复), notable Chinese scholar, translator
Wu Lifu (伍蠡甫), traditional Chinese painter, translator, writer, poet, literary critic
Wang Anyi (王安忆), novelist, 2000 Mao Dun Literature Prize winner
Wang Huo (王火), novelist and screenwriter, 1997 Mao Dun Literature Prize winner
Liang Xiaosheng (梁晓声), novelist and screenwriter, 2019 Mao Dun Literature Prize winner
Chen Sihe (陈思和), literary critic
Hong Ying (虹影), writer, poet
Li Wenjun (李文俊), translator, proser, writer
Xia Zhengnong (夏征农), writer, chief editor of Chinese encyclopedia Cihai.
Eugene Yuejin Wang (汪悦进), sinologist, Abby Aldrich Rockefeller Professor of Asian Art, Harvard University
Charles Burton (黄承安), sinologist, former Canadian diplomat and senior Government advisor
Liam D'Arcy Brown, a notable British sinologist, travel-writer 
Luo Jialun (罗家伦), educator, historian, diplomat, and political activist. First President of National Tsing Hua University. President of National Central University
Qiu Xigui (裘锡圭), historian and palaeographer
Tang Zhijun (汤志钧), historian
Ge Jianxiong (葛剑雄), historical geographer
Ge Zhaoguang (葛兆光), historian
Lu Li'an (卢丽安), scholar of English literature and politician of Taiwanese origin
Qian Wenzhong (钱文忠), historian, Tibetologist, Indologist 
Xu Fancheng (徐梵澄), philosopher, Indologist, poet, painter
Yang Hengjun, writer, blogger

Social Sciences 
Wang Tieya (王铁崖), eminent Chinese jurist
Hanming Fang (方汉明), economist, University of Pennsylvania
Yingyao Hu (胡颖尧), economist, Johns Hopkins University
Panle Jia (贾攀乐), economist, Cornell University
Wei Jiang (姜纬), economist, Columbia University
Zheng (Michael) Song (宋铮), economist, Chinese University of Hong Kong
Shang-Jin Wei (魏尚进), economist, Columbia University
Wu Jinglian (吴敬琏), economist
Lin Zhou (周林), economist, Shanghai Jiaotong University; Fellow of Econometric Society
Yihong Xia (夏一红), economist, Wharton School, University of Pennsylvania
Hua He (何华), economist, Yale University
Xunyu Zhou (周迅宇), economist, Columbia University
Yusheng Zheng (郑渝生), economist, Wharton School
Luqiu Luwei (闾丘露薇), journalist
Lode Li (李乐德), management scientist, member of the Institute of Operations Research and the Management Sciences, Yale University
David D. Yao (姚大卫 Yao Dawei), professor of Operations Research at Columbia University.
Ying Natasha Zhang (Natasha Foutz), professor of management at the R.H Smith School of Business, University of Maryland
Xueguang Zhou (周雪光), sociologist, Stanford University
Dingxin Zhao (赵鼎新), sociologist, University of Chicago
Jing Yang, economist, Bank of Canada
Shu Yang, materials scientist, University of Pennsylvania
Ma Jun (马骏), Chief Economist, PBOC (Central Bank of China)

Natural sciences and mathematics 
Zhu Kezhen (竺可桢), meteorologist, educator, PhD from Harvard University
Shoucheng Zhang (张守晟), physicist, professor at Stanford University.
Shen Zhi-Xun (沈志勋), physicist, professor at Stanford University.
Fujia Yang (杨福家 Yang Fujia), physicist and university administrator, the chancellor of the University of Nottingham.
Li Ta-tsien (李大潜 Li Daqian), mathematician and member of the French Academy of Sciences.
Li Jun (李俊), mathematician, professor at Stanford University.
Chen Dayue (陈大岳), mathematician and statistician, professor at Peking University.
Xiao-Li Meng (孟晓犁), mathematician and statistician, chair professor at Harvard University
Jianqing Fan (范剑青), statistician, Princeton University
Zhiliang Ying (应志良), co-chair of the Statistics Department at Columbia University
Xuming He, statistician, University of Michigan
Tong Dizhou (童第周), biologist.
Rao Yi (饶毅), neurobiologist, Peking University
Lu Bai (鲁白), neurobiologist, Tsinghua University
Yibin Kang (康毅滨), Warner-Lambert/Parke-Davis Professor of Molecular Biology at Princeton University
Shi Yang (施扬), biologist, Harvard Medical School
Junying Yuan, biologist, professor at Harvard University.
Xu Tian (许田), biologist, professor at Yale University.
Wei Yang, biologist, senior investigator at NIH.
Zucai Suo, biochemist, professor at Ohio State University.
Zhaojun Bai (柏兆俊), mathematician and computer scientist at University of California, Davis

Education 
Luo Jialun (罗家伦), President of Tsinghua University and National Central University. 
Wu Nanxuan (吴南轩), President of Tsinghua University, Fudan University, and Yingshi University
Zhu Kezhen (竺可桢), President of Zhejiang University.
Cheng Tien-fong (程天放), President of Zhejiang University, Anhui University, and Sichuan University.\
Zing-Yang Kuo (郭任远), President of Zhejiang University.
Chen Xujing (陈序经), President of Jinan University and Lingnan University, Vice President of Nankai University and Sun Yat-sen University.
Hu Dunfu (胡敦复), President of Utopia University.
Huang Jilu (黄季陆), President of Sichuan University.
Cao Huiqun (曹惠群), President of Utopia University.
Joseph K. Twanmoh (端木愷), President of Anhui University and Soochow University
Xu Xinwu (许心武), President of Henan University

Medicine 
Chen Zhongwei, expert of orthopedic surgery and microsurgery, one of the pioneers of the process of reattaching severed limbs.
Shen Ziyin (沈自尹)
Gu Yudong (顾玉东)
Tang Zhaoyou (汤钊猷)
Tang Yuhan, oncologist, president of Hong Kong Chinese Medical Association and the founder of Tang Fund
Chen Haozhu (陈灏珠)
Wen Yumei (闻玉梅), virologist and microbiologist.
Zhou Liangfu (周良辅) neurosurgeon

Business 
Zhang Shengman (章晟曼), managing director of World Bank Group
Zhu Min (朱民), Deputy managing director of the International Monetary Fund
Li Dak-sum (李达三), GBM, JP, Hong Kong entrepreneur, philanthropist
Thomas Tseng-tao Chen (陈曾焘), CBE, Hong Kong entrepreneur, Chairman of Hang Lung Group
Guo Guangchang (郭广昌), chairman of Fosun International Limited and the representative of 12th Chinese People's Political Consultative Conference
Lu Zhiqiang (卢志强), billionaire property developer
Chen Tianqiao (陈天桥), former China's richest man, founder, and CEO of SNDA Co& (Nasdaq: snda)
Cao Guowei (曹国伟), CEO of Sina
Wang Changtian (王长田), Founder and CEO of Enlight Media
Qi Lu (陆奇), President of the Online Services Group, Microsoft and former Executive Vice President of Engineering for the Search and Advertising Technology Group at Yahoo!
Yan Huo (霍焱), founder of Capula Investment Management
Liang Jianzhang (梁建章), founder and CEO of Ctrip 
Xiaohu Zhu (朱啸虎), managing director at GSR Ventures Management
Jianhang Jin (金建杭), President of Alibaba Group
Fan Jiang (蒋凡), President of Taobao, President & Board Chairman of Tmall
Jane Zhang (investor), entrepreneur and a Chinese angel investor from Shanghai.
Ji Shisan (姬十三), CEO and founder of Guokr (果壳网)
Guo Guangchang (郭廣昌), founder and chairman of Fosun International Limited

Entertainment 
Shang Wenjie (尚雯婕), singer
Jiang Changjian (蒋昌建), host
Lao Fanqie (老番茄), blogger
Afu Thomas (Thomas Derksen), German internet personality in China
Amy Lyons, Australian internet personality in China, did a student exchange term at Fudan

Notable professors
Ma Yinchu (马寅初 1882–1982), economist
Yan Fuqing (颜福庆 1882–1970), Chinese public health pioneer
Lu Simian (吕思勉 1884–1957), historian
Gu Jiegang (顾颉刚 1893–1980), historian
Su Buqing (苏步青 1902–2003), mathematician
Chen Jiangong (陈建功), mathematician
Zhou Gucheng (周谷城), historian and social activist
Wu Lifu (伍蠡甫), translator, painter
Wang Fushan (王福山), physicist, Heisenberg's graduate student
Zhou Tongqing (周同庆), physicist
Liang Zongdai (梁宗岱)
Tan Jiazhen (谈家桢), geneticist who established the first genetics program in China
Xie Xide (谢希德 1921–2000), physicist
Lu Hefu (卢鹤绂), physicist
Gu Yidong (顾翼东 1903–1996), chemist
Gu Chaohao (谷超豪), mathematician
Tan Qixiang (谭其骧), historian.
Qiu Xigui (裘锡圭), historian and palaeographer
Yan Su (颜苏), Professor of Law
Zhao Jingshen (赵景深), popular Chinese novelist
Xia Daoxing (夏道行), mathematician
Wang Weiqi (王威琪), professor of biomedical engineering
Lu Gusun (陆谷孙), lexicography master
Ge Chuangui (葛传槼), linguist
Lin Tongji (林同济), linguist
Dong Wenqiao (董问樵), famed translator
Yang Qishen (杨岂深), famed translator
Zhang Yongzhen (张永振), virologist
Chen Sihe (陈思和), professor of modern Chinese literature
Wang Anyi (王安忆), famous Chinese writer
Chen Shangjun (陈尚君), professor of ancient Chinese literature
Jin Yaqiu (金亚秋), professor of electrical engineering
Jin Li (金力), professor of Evolutionary Genetics.
Feng Donglai, Physicist
Mao Ying (毛颖), professor of Neurosurgery
Wu Jinsong (吴劲松), professor of Neurosurgery
Chen Zhimin (陈志敏), Political Scientist

References

.

 
 
Fudan University